Leigh Kelly (born 27 August 1974) is a New Zealand cricketer. He played in two first-class matches for Wellington in 1998/99.

See also
 List of Wellington representative cricketers

References

External links
 

1974 births
Living people
New Zealand cricketers
Wellington cricketers
Cricketers from Palmerston North